Baroa punctibasalis is a moth of the subfamily Arctiinae. It was described by Wileman and West in 1928 and is found on the Philippines (Luzon, Samar and Palawan). The habitat consists of lowland secondary forests.

Adults have been recorded on wing in February and July.

References

Arctiini